The Suzuka 500 km, was the opening round of the 1987 All Japan Sports Prototype Championship  was held at the Suzuka Circuit, on 12 April, in front of a crowd of approximately 18,000.

Report

Entry
A total of 24 cars were entered for the event, across three classes ranging from Local Prototypes to Group C Prototypes.

Qualifying
The pairing of Hideki Okada and Mike Thackwell took pole position for From A Racing, in their Porsche 962C ahead of the new partnership of Kazuyoshi Hoshino and Kenji Takahashi for Hoshino Racing, in their Nissan R87E, by just 0.42secs.

Race
The race was held over 85 laps of the Suzuka circuit, a distance of 500 km (actual distance was 502.519 km). Hideki Okada and Mike Thackwell took the winner spoils for From A Racing, driving their Porsche 962C. The pair won in a time of 2hr 57:25.959mins., averaging a speed of 106.206 mph. Second place went to Kunimitsu Takahashi and Kenny Acheson in the Advan Alpha Nova’s Porsche 962C who finished just 2.775 seconds adrift. Also, the lead lap, was the third placed Toyota 87C of Geoff Lees and Alan Jones.

Classification

Race Result

Class Winners are in Bold text.

References

All Japan Sports Prototype Championship
International Suzuka 500km
Suzuka